Anamika Saha is an Indian actress who predominantly worked in Bengali film industry.

Early life
Saha was born in Jessore, Khulna, Bangladesh, Bangladesh as Usha. In 1961, she passed Higher Secondary examination from Deshbandhu Balika Vidyalaya and joined in Scottish Church College. She started her acting career in 1973 in a Bengali film Ashar Alo. Saha got her first break through in Tollywood film industry in Tarun Majumdar’s film Sansar Simante (1974).

Filmography

1973–2000 
 Ashar Alo (1973)
 Sansar Simante (1974)
 Golap Bou (1977)
 Dui Purush (1978)
 Ganadevata (1979)
 Rajnandini (1980)
 Pratishodh (1981)
 Ashleelotar Daye (1983)
 Agami Kal (1983)
 Agni Shuddhi (1984)
 Till Theke Tal (1985)
 Amar Kantak (1985)
 Mon Mane Na (1993)
 Naach Nagini Naach Re (1996)

2001–Present 
 Sathi (2002)
 Mayer Anchal (2003)
 Arjun Aamar Naam (2003)
 Badsha The King (2004)
 Paribar (2004)
 Bazi (2005)
 Janmadata (2008)
 Aami Montri Hobo (2011)
 Mone Mone Bhalobasa (2011)
 Warrant: The Mission (2011)
 Mon Bole Priya Priya (2011)
 Oh My Love (2011)
 Bangal Ghoti Phataphati (2012)
 Prayoshchitto (2012)
 8:08 Er Bongaon Local (2012)
 Panga Nibi Na Sala (2013)
 Love Ashram (2016)
 Tuski (2018)
 Hoichoi Unlimited (2018)
 Ballygunger Bor Barishaler Bou (2021)

TV Shows

 Alo Chhaya as Kundalata (Zee Bangla)
 Didi No. 1 as herself (Zee Bangla)
 Simana Periye  (Sun Bangla)
 Bhalobasha Bhalobasha as Aundhuti (Colors Bangla)
 Mahapeeth Tarapith  (Star Jalsha)
  Lalkuthi as Karunamoyee (Zee Bangla)

References

External links 
 

Living people
People from Jessore District
Actresses in Bengali cinema
Scottish Church College alumni
University of Calcutta alumni
Indian film actresses
Year of birth missing (living people)
People from Khulna